Eylo was the first count of Álava around 868.

Eylo, Eilo, Ello, Elo or Ailo was also a women's name in 11th- and 12th-century Spain. Its origin is unknown, but it has been proposed that it is a hypocoristic of Eulalia, that it is a short form of Eloísa (Latin Aloysia, the feminin form of Louis) or that it is the same as the Gothic name Egilo/Egilona, spelled to reflect contemporary pronunciation.

It may refer to:

Eylo Alfonso (fl. 1075–1109), daughter of Count Alfonso Muñoz and wife of Count Pedro Ansúrez
Eylo Álvarez (fl. 1114–1148), daughter of Álvar Fáñez and wife of Rodrigo Fernández de Castro

References